The Shōninki ( Japanese 正 忍 記) is a medieval ninja document from Kishū province. 

Written by Natori Masatake in 1681 it describes the espionage strategies of the shinobi from Kishū. Together with the Bansenshukai and Ninpiden it is one of three major extant writings of the ninja. An original copy of the Shōninki is in the State Library of Tokyo.

Contents 
The Shōninki is divided into Preface (Jo), three scrolls (Shomaki, Chumaki, Gemaki) and an epilogue (Okusho).

In the preface, the author discusses the different types of spies and the principles of espionage. 

The first scroll addresses basic skills, such as disguise and concealment, house-breaking and information gathering. The second part deals with defense against enemy spies, human nature, physiognomy, recognizing and eliciting the true intentions of people and laying false trails and clues. The final scroll is concerned with one's own emotional states as well as those of other people (including godai).

References

Bibliography 

 

 

 Jon E. Graham, trans. Shoninki: The Secret Teachings of the Ninja; The 17th-Century Manual on the Art of Concealment. With commentaries by Axel Mazuer. Rochester, Vt.–Torono: 2010.

External links 
 Shoninki online web.archive.org (Japanese / English) at ninpo.org
 Shoninki online (Japanese / English) at ninpo.org

Japanese non-fiction literature
Japanese martial arts